If You Love Me, Let Me Know is a United States and Canada-only album by singer Olivia Newton-John, released on 28 May 1974. Other than the title track, all the material was from her previous three albums, Olivia (1972), Music Makes My Day (1973) and Long Live Love (1974). It is her first album to top the Billboard 200 pop albums chart.

Two hit singles were released from the album, the title song and "I Honestly Love You", the latter of which became Newton-John's first number-one US single, and her signature song as well.

Background
Six of the tracks on the album are from her European and Australian release, Long Live Love, two are tracks from Olivia and one from Music Makes My Day, with the title song being the only new addition.

Reception

It was the first of two Newton-John albums to top the Billboard 200 pop albums chart, the second being Have You Never Been Mellow the following year. Two hit singles were culled from the LP in the US: the title song (No. 5) and "I Honestly Love You", the latter of which became Newton-John's first number-one single in the US after listener requests for the song prompted MCA to release it as a single, much to Newton-John's delight after she originally pleaded with the label to release it as such. Both songs reached the top 10 of the US Pop, Adult Contemporary and Country charts, affirming Newton-John's status as the top female country-crossover star of the day and continuing the chart hot streak begun with the Grammy-winning "Let Me Be There" the previous year.

The title track ranks as Newton-John's highest-charting single on the country charts, reaching No. 2, although she would have more top 10 hits.

The album was certified Gold in the US.

The album was nominated for the Country Music Association Award for Album of the Year in 1974 and was the first album by a non-American artist to be nominated.

Track listing
Side one
"If You Love Me (Let Me Know)" (John Rostill)
"Mary Skeffington" * (Gerry Rafferty)
"Country Girl" ** (Alan Hawkshaw, Peter Gosling)
"I Honestly Love You" ** (Peter Allen, Jeff Barry)
"Free the People" ** (Barbara Keith)

Side two
"The River's Too Wide" ** (Bob Morrison) 
"Home Ain't Home Anymore" ** (John Farrar, Peter Robinson)
"God Only Knows" ** (Brian Wilson, Tony Asher)
"Changes" * (Olivia Newton-John)
"You Ain't Got the Right" *** (Dennis Locorriere, Ray Sawyer, Ron Haffkine, Jay David)
(* denotes a previous release outside the US on Olivia [1972].)
(** denotes a previous release outside the US on Long Live Love [1974].)
(*** denotes a previous release outside the US on Music Makes My Day/Let Me Be There (AUS) [1973/74].)

Charts

Weekly charts

Year-end charts

Certifications and sales

References

1974 albums
Olivia Newton-John albums
Albums produced by John Farrar
Albums produced by Bruce Welch
MCA Records albums